Point Blank is a 1998 American direct-to-video film directed by Matt Earl Beesley and starring Mickey Rourke.  The film was shot on location in Fort Worth, Texas.

Premise
A group of escapees from prison take over a shopping mall, only to be stopped by the brother of one of the fugitives.

Cast
 Mickey Rourke as Rudy Ray
 Danny Trejo as Wallace
 Kevin Gage as Joe Ray
 James Gammon as Dad
 Frederic Forrest as Mac Bradford
 Paul Ben-Victor as Howard

External links 
 
 

1998 films
1998 direct-to-video films
1998 action films
Films shot in Texas
American independent films
1998 directorial debut films
1990s English-language films
1990s American films